The 2016 Cuyahoga County Council election was held on November 8, 2016, to elect members of the County Council of Cuyahoga County, Ohio. Even-numbered districts were up for election to four-year terms.

The Republicans defended their single seat up for election, while the Democrats defended all 4 of theirs, maintaining the partisan balance in the chamber. The only contested district was District 2, which was won by incumbent Democratic council member Dale Miller.

District 2

Democratic primary

Primary results

Republican primary

Primary results

General election

Results

District 4

Democratic primary

Primary results

Republican primary

Primary results

General election

Results

District 6

Republican primary

Primary results

General election

Results

District 8

Democratic primary

Primary results

General election

Results

District 10

Democratic primary

Primary results

General election

Results

References

Cuyahoga County Council
Cuyahoga County Council
2016 Council
Cuyahoga County Council